Vossius ring (also called Vossius's ring or Vossius' ring) is due to blunt trauma to the eye. When the eye is injured, a circular ring of fainted or stippled opacity is seen on the anterior surface of the lens due to brown amorphous granules of pigment lying on the capsule. It has the same diameter as the contracted pupil, and is due to impression of the iris on the lens as a result of the force of a concussion injury, which drives the cornea and iris backward.

It is named after German ophthalmologist Adolf Vossius, who first described the condition in 1906.

References

External links

 NIH website

Eye diseases